The 2021–22 season was the 82nd season in the existence of SD Eibar and the club's first season back in the second division of Spanish football since 2014. In addition to the domestic league, Eibar participated in this season's edition of the Copa del Rey.

Players

First-team squad

Transfers

Pre-season and friendlies

Competitions

Overall record

Segunda División

League table

Results summary

Results by round

Matches
The league fixtures were announced on 30 June 2021.

Promotion play-offs

Copa del Rey

References

SD Eibar seasons
Eibar